Belbase is a surname from the Middle Hills of western Nepal.There is a story behind the surname "Belbase". Belbases were born in Rolpa and went to the village Belbas in Pyuthan District where he had taken rest under a 'bel' tree. It translates as "Place of Rest", literally staying under a Bel tree.  People who moved from there to other parts of Nepal became known as Belbase. They have their family deity Dudhe Masta and they belong to Madugalya Gotra. Others with this surname come from Arghakhanchi District of Lumbini Zone. Belbases can also be known by Koirala. Belbases have moved to other parts of Nepal as well as other countries. Belbases are found over Arghakhachi, Kapilvastu, Dang, Nepalgunj, Kathmandu mostly. Belbases can now be found all over the world including America and Europe.

Notable people with this name 
Ms Ganga Belbase, member of the National Assembly of Nepal 2020, Nepal Communist Party
Mr Kumar Belbase, spokesperson for Communist Party of Nepal (Marxist–Leninist) (2002), leading member of Nepal Samyabadi Party (Marksbadi–Leninbadi–Maobadi)
Mr Pundari Prasad Belbase, Chairman (2013), Communist Party of Nepal (Marxist–Leninist–Maoist) Samyabadi

Surnames of Nepalese origin
Society of Nepal
Khas surnames